Luca Torreggiani or Luca Torrigiani (died 1669) was a Roman Catholic prelate who served as Archbishop of Ravenna (1645–1669).

Biography
On 18 September 1645 Luca Torreggiani was appointed, during the papacy of Pope Innocent X, as Archbishop of Ravenna.
On 15 October 1645, he was consecrated as a bishop by Luigi Capponi, Cardinal-Priest of San Lorenzo in Lucina, with Alfonso Gonzaga, Titular Archbishop of Rhodus, and Girolamo Farnese, Titular Archbishop of Patrae, serving as co-consecrators. 
He served as Archbishop of Ravenna until his death on 2 December 1669.

Episcopal succession
While bishop, he was the principal consecrator of:
Giovanni Stefano Donghi, Bishop of Ajaccio (1652);
and the principal co-consecrator of:

References

External links and additional sources
 (for Chronology of Bishops) 
 (for Chronology of Bishops) 

17th-century Italian Roman Catholic archbishops
Bishops appointed by Pope Innocent X
1669 deaths